Daniel Tetour (born 17 July 1994) is a professional Czech football player who currently plays for Baník Ostrava.

References

External links
 
 Profile at fotbal.cz 

Czech footballers
1994 births
Living people
Association football midfielders
Czech First League players
Czech National Football League players
FK Dukla Prague players
Czech Republic under-21 international footballers
FC Baník Ostrava players
Footballers from Prague